Burkhard Leuschke (born 27 April 1940) is a retired East German race walker.

He finished fourth at the 1964 Olympic Games, won the silver medal at the 1965 IAAF World Race Walking Cup and the bronze medal at the 1970 IAAF World Race Walking Cup.

Leuschke represented the sports club SC Dynamo Berlin and became East German champion over 35 km in 1963.

References

1940 births
Living people
East German male racewalkers
Athletes (track and field) at the 1964 Summer Olympics
Olympic athletes of the United Team of Germany
Athletes (track and field) at the 1968 Summer Olympics
Olympic athletes of East Germany